Mallotochromene is a phloroglucinol derivative found in the pericarp of the fruits of Mallotus japonicus.

References 

Phloroglucinols
Benzopyrans